
 
 

Bullock Hill  Conservation Park is a protected area located in the Australian state of South Australia in the locality of   Ashbourne about  south of the state capital of Adelaide  and about  south-west of the town of   Strathalbyn.

The conservation park consists of land in Sections 2082 to 2084 and 2086 in the cadastral unit of the Hundred of Kondoparinga. It was proclaimed on 30 January 2014  over land intended to be given protected area status as recently as the 1990s. A separate proclamation on the same day preserved existing “rights of entry, prospecting, exploration or mining” over the land. Its name was  approved by the Surveyor General of South Australia on 11 March 1997 and is derived  from Bullock Hill, a hill of  height which is located within the boundaries of the conservation park.

A brochure published in 2011 by the then Department of Environment and Natural Resources about three years before the proclamation of the conservation park in 2014 described it as consisting of a forest of pink and gums over an understory dominated by acacia species with a grassland on its eastern side which includes a scattering of blue gum.  The official webpage for the conservation park advises that it has a population of Western grey kangaroos and contains bird species such as red wattlebirds, rainbow bee-eater, brown-headed honeyeaters, black-faced cuckoo-shrike and grey shrike-thrush.  

The conservation park is classified as an IUCN Category III protected area.

See also
Protected areas of South Australia

References

External links
Official webpage
Bullock Hill  Conservation Park webpage on the Protected Planet website
Bullock Hill  Conservation Park webpage on the BirdsSA website

Conservation parks of South Australia
Protected areas established in 2014  
2014 establishments in Australia